The Junior Ryder Cup is a team golf competition between Europe and the United States for junior golfers aged 18 and under. It is based on the men's Ryder Cup and is run by the same organisations, the PGA of America and Ryder Cup Europe.

The 2018 event took place at Golf Disneyland, Marne-la-Vallée, Paris, France on Monday 24 and Tuesday 25 September. The United States won 12–11, their sixth successive victory in the event.

Format
The teams consist of six boys and six girls. From 2008 to 2018 the tournament was played over two days of foursomes, fourball and singles matches. There were three boys' matches and three girls' foursomes matches and six mixed fourball matches on the first day. There were 12 singles matches on the second day, In 2023 the event will be extended to three days with foursomes and fourballs played on the first two days and the singles played on the final day. From 2008 to 2018 there was an informal "friendship match" played on the Ryder Cup course after the Junior Ryder Cup but before the Ryder Cup. However in 2023 the final day singles matches will be played at the host venue. From 1997 to 2006 only fourball matches were played. There were three boys' matches and three girls' matches on the first day and six mixed matches on the second day.

History
In 1995 an informal match was played between European junior golfers and Central New York PGA Section and area juniors. The European team included 15-year-old Sergio García.

Results

1In the event of a tie the current holder retains the cup.

Source:

Future venues
2023: Golf Nazionale and Marco Simone Golf and Country Club in Italy from September 26–28

Teams
Soutce:

United States
2018
Girls: Rachel Heck, Lucy Li, Yealimi Noh, Alexa Pano, Erica Shepherd, Rose Zhang
Boys: Akshay Bhatia, Ricky Castillo, Canon Claycomb, William Moll, Cole Ponich, Michael Thorbjornsen

2016:
Girls: Alyaa Abdulghany, Hailee Cooper, Gina Kim, Lucy Li, Emilia Migliaccio, Kaitlyn Papp
Boys: Wilson Furr, Noah Goodwin, Eugene Hong, Davis Shore, Patrick Welch, Norman Xiong

2014:
Girls: Sierra Brooks, Kristen Gillman, Amy Lee, Andrea Lee, Hannah O'Sullivan, Bethany Wu
Boys: Sam Burns, Austin Connelly, Brad Dalke, Gordon Neale, Davis Riley, Cameron Young

2012:
Girls: Casie Cathrea, Karen Chung, Casey Danielson, Alison Lee, Esther Lee, Samantha Wagner
Boys: Cameron Champ, Gavin Hall, Beau Hossler, Jim Liu, Scottie Scheffler, Robby Shelton

2010:
Girls: Doris Chen, Ginger Howard, Cassy Isagawa, Alison Lee, Kristen Park, Emma Talley
Boys: Jim Liu, Denny McCarthy, Anthony Paolucci, Ollie Schniederjans, Jordan Spieth, Justin Thomas

2008:
Girls: Sarah Brown, Danielle Frasier, Jennifer Johnson, Erynne Lee, Tiffany Lua, Lexi Thompson
Boys: Jeffrey Kang, Anthony Paolucci, Cameron Peck, Jordan Spieth, Cory Whitsett, Andrew Yun

2006:
Girls: Brittany Altomare, Cassandra Blaney, Esther Choe, Vicky Hurst, Isabelle Lendl, Kristen Schelling
Boys: Bud Cauley, Tony Finau, Philip Francis, Drew Kittleson, Joe Monte, Andrew Yun

2004:
Girls: Kelly Fuchik, Mina Harigae, Angela Oh, Anne Ormson, Jessica Smith, Tessa Teachman
Boys: Chris DeForest, Josh Dupont, Kyle English, Tony Finau, Luke Guthrie, Chase Wright

2002:
Girls: Tiffany Chudy, Mallory Code, Stephanie Connelly, Jennifer Davis, Lauren Mielbrecht, Jenny Suh
Boys: Travis Esway, Shaun Felechner, Taylor Hall, Adam Porzak, Colin Wilcox, Casey Wittenberg

1999:
Girls: Erica Blasberg, Catherine Cartwright, Leigh Anne Hardin, Cheryl Hennessy, Ina Kim, Angela Rho
Boys: Michael Barbosa, Jason Hartwick, Hunter Mahan, Matt Rosenfeld, Ty Tryon, James Vargas

1997:
Girls: Beth Bauer, Leigh Anne Hardin, Angela Jerman, Blair O'Neal, Kim Rowton, Cimmie Shahan
Boys: J. C. DeLeon, Bubba Dickerson, David Gossett, John Klauk, James Oh, Leif Olson

Europe
2018:
Girls: Emilie Alba Paltrinieri, Annabell Fuller, Ingrid Lindblad, Amanda Linnér, Alessia Nobilio, Emma Spitz
Boys: Conor Gough, Nicolai Højgaard, Rasmus Højgaard, David Puig, Eduard Rousaud Sabate, Robin Williams

2016:
Girls: Emilie Alba Paltrinieri, Julia Engström, Frida Kinhult, Pauline Roussin-Bouchard, Emma Spitz, Beatrice Wallin
Boys: Jonathan Goth-Rasmussen, Falko Hanisch, Matias Honkala, Adrien Pendaries, Kristoffer Reitan, Marcus Svensson

2014:
Girls: Mathilda Cappeliez, Virginia Elena Carta, Annabel Dimmock, Alexandra Försterling, Emily Kristine Pedersen, Linnea Ström
Boys: John Axelsen, Ivan Cantero Gutierrez, Marcus Kinhult, Bradley Neil, Renato Paratore, Max Schmitt

2012:
Girls: Quirine Eijkenboom, Bronte Law, Harang Lee, Emily Kristine Pedersen, Covadonga Sanjuan, Linnea Ström
Boys: Dominic Foos, Gavin Moynihan, Renato Paratore, Matthias Schwab, Victor Tärnström, Toby Tree

2010:
Girls: Amy Boulden, Isabella Deilert, Manon Gidali, Manon Mollé, Klára Spilková, Kelly Tidy
Boys: Thomas Detry, Albert Eckhardt, Juhana Kukkonen, Moritz Lampert, Chris Lloyd, Kristoffer Ventura

2008:
Girls: Anna Arrese, Carly Booth, Leona Maguire, Lisa Maguire, Daisy Nielsen, Kelly Tidy
Boys: Julien Brun, Stanislas Gautier, Moritz Lampert, Chris Lloyd, Matteo Manassero, Adrián Otaegui

2006:
Girls: Carly Booth, Carlota Ciganda, Laura Gonzales-Escallon, Saskia Hausladen, Giulia Molinaro, Marta Silva
Boys: Victor Dubuisson, Sean Einhaus, Pedro Figueiredo, Are Friestad, Maximilian Kieffer, Anders Kristiansen

2004:
Girls: Carlota Ciganda, Linn Gustafsson, Camilla Lennarth, Belen Mozo, Florentyna Parker, Valerie Sternebeck 
Boys: Dominic Angkawidjaja, Oliver Fisher, Lluís García del Moral, Zac Gould, Rory McIlroy, Marius Thorp

2002:
Girls: Carmen Alonso, Emma Cabrera-Bello, Claire Grignolo, Dewi Claire Schreefel, Denise Simon, Katharina Werdinig
Boys: Raphaël De Sousa, Matteo Delpodio, Peter-Max Hamm, Farren Keenan, Tony Raillard, Benjamin Régent

1999:
Girls: Carmen Alonzo, Tullia Calzavara, Martina Eberl, Lucia Mar, Suzann Pettersen, Denise Simon
Boys: Rafa Cabrera-Bello, Nicolas Colsaerts, Raphaël De Sousa, Alfonso Gutierrez, David Porter, Craig Stevenson

1997:
Girls: Nuria Clau, Vikki Laing, Paula Martí, Suzann Pettersen, Federica Piovano, Giulia Sergas
Boys: Pascal Celhay, Nicolas Colsaerts, Ómar Halldórsson, Roberto Paolillo, Stefano Reale, Tuomas Tuovinen

See also
Junior Solheim Cup
Junior Presidents Cup

References

External links

Junior golf tournaments
Team golf tournaments
Ryder Cup